Matthew Holmes (born in Paisley in 1844 and died in Lenzie on 3 July 1903) was Locomotive Superintendent of the North British Railway from 1882 to 1903.

The office had two deputies, the senior known as Assistant Locomotive Superintendent and Chief Draughtsman, the junior known as Assistant Locomotive Superintendent. Throughout his incumbency, Holmes's Assistant Locomotive Superintendent and Chief Draughtsman was Robert Chalmers. Various men held the position of Assistant Locomotive Superintendent, the last to do so being William Paton Reid. Holmes was succeeded in office by Reid. Later, Reid was to be succeeded by Robert Chalmers' son, Walter.

Locomotive Designs
Locomotives designed by Holmes include:
 NBR Class C, later LNER Class J36 0-6-0,  
 NBR D class 0-6-0T, later LNER Class J83 0-6-0T 
 NBR Class M, later LNER Class D31 4-4-0  
NBR D class 0-6-0

See also
 Locomotives of the North British Railway

References

1844 births
1903 deaths
North British Railway people
Scottish railway mechanical engineers
Scottish mechanical engineers
19th-century Scottish people
19th-century British engineers
Engineers from Paisley, Renfrewshire
People from Lenzie
20th-century British engineers